Klazienaveen is a town to the southeast of Emmen in the Dutch province of Drenthe. It is located approx  from the German border. Klazienaveen started as a peat colony owned by Willem Albert Scholten. It has been named after Klaassien Sluis, the wife of Scholten.

History 
In 1874, Willem Albert Scholten bought the  Smeulveen to exploit the peat. In 1890, Scholten offered the skipper Jan Adde Hazewinkel a flag as the first person to transport the peat. In 1899, a village appeared along the canal. In 1903, Scholten's son Jan Evert renamed Smeulveen and the village Klazienaveen after his mother Klaassien Sluis. It is one of the two villages in the Netherlands named after a non-royal woman. In 1932, it was home to 2,327 people.

In 1921, the Purit factory opened and produces Norit (activated carbon). On 23 March 1945, the factory was bombed by the Royal Air Force causing eight deaths among the factory workers. The clock in the engine room stopped and has remained as a reminder. Since 2012, it is owned by Cabot Corporation. After World War II, Klazienaveen started expanding rapidly. In the 1960s, greenhouse cultivation started in Klazienaveen. The town can reached via the A37 motorway.

Notable people 
 Ruben Roosken (born 2000), footballer
 Hanja Maij-Weggen (born 1943), politician and former Queen's Commissioner of North Brabant

Gallery

References

External links 
 
 Local news site (in Dutch)

Populated places in Drenthe
Emmen, Netherlands
1899 establishments in the Netherlands